Sidhi  is a 1999 Filipino drama film directed by Joel Lamangan. The film stars Nora Aunor, Glydel Mercado and Albert Martinez.The film was based on Rolando Tinio's Palanca-winning teleplay, Ang Kwento ni Ah, which was expanded into a movie script by Ricardo Lee.

The film won for Mercado all the Best Supporting Actress Awards given by the four annual award-giving bodies in the Philippines that time. The film also gave a posthumous award to Rolando Tinio for Best story at the FAMAS Awards.

Synopsis
Ana is a woman who is a sharecropper who falls for Michael unfortunately Michael is after Ana and her money Michael brings home his new lover and are castaways in an isolating village Ana becomes a submissive wife only to be betrayed and hurt in the end Michael gets killed as he tries to kill Ana and Mayang unfortunately Ana survives after Mayangs child birth ends in tragedy leaving her with nothing but a new beginning in life
Eventually, Ana kills Michael and takes care of the Mayang's son.

Cast
Nora Aunor as Ah/Anna
Albert Martinez as Michael
Glydel Mercado as Mayang
Caridad Sanchez as Tia Manuella
Samantha Lopez as Dolores
Ray Ventura as Badong
Angie Ferro as Ina
Tony Masbesa as Fr. Morales

Awards

List of film festivals competed or exhibited
1999 - Chicago International Film Festival, Feature Film,
1999 - Cinemanila International Film Festival
2000 - 2nd New York Filipino Film Festival Lincoln

References

External links
 

Filipino-language films
Philippine drama films
Crown Seven films
Films directed by Joel Lamangan